Dibenzothiazepines are chemical compounds which are derivatives of thiazepine with two benzene rings.

Examples include quetiapine, tianeptine, and metiapine.

References 

Dibenzothiazepines